Akaash Singh is an American stand-up comedian, actor, and podcaster. He is best known for hosting the Flagrant  podcast with Andrew Schulz and his comedy special Bring Back Apu on YouTube.

Career

Stand-up comedy
Singh began performing stand-up comedy by his freshman year in college as he performed at his first open mic in Denton, Texas.
In February 2022, Singh self-released his first comedy special, Bring Back Apu on YouTube.

Television, film, and web series
Singh was featured in five episodes of the improv comedy show Wild 'n Out (2014-2015), moving to a creative consultant role in 2017. Additionally, he appeared in a smaller role in HBO's The Leftovers (2014) and was a cast member for the fifth season of MTV's Guy Code (2015). In 2016, Singh appeared as Mookie in the Netflix series Brown Nation

Podcasts

Singh co-hosts the Flagrant 2 podcast with fellow comedian Andrew Schulz, with support from AlexxMedia and Mark Gagnon. Originally intended to be a sports podcast, as of 2022, it focuses on current events and pop culture. The podcast releases two episodes a week and an additional episode exclusively for Patreon subscribers.

References

External links
 
 

1984 births
Living people
American people of Indian descent
American comedians
American comedians of Indian descent
Austin College alumni